Jan de Haan (born July 29, 1951 in Warns, Friesland) is a contemporary Dutch composer, conductor and musician.

Jan de Haan was born in the Frisian village of Warns, in the Netherlands, in 1951. His first inspiration came from his father, who was a great lover of wind music. At an early age, Jan de Haan was attracted to conducting. By the age of seventeen, he was already the conductor of several wind bands. From 1969 until 1973 he studied music education and trombone at the Pedagogical Academy of Music in Leeuwarden, and in 1976 he was awarded his conductor’s certificate with Henk van Lijnschooten at the Conservatory in Utrecht. Until 1994, Jan de Haan was the conductor of the well-known Dutch brass band Soli Brass. As a guest conductor, he also worked with a number of professional and amateur wind bands and ensembles. In this capacity Jan has travelled extensively throughout Western Europe, and to the USA, Iran, and Japan. Famous bands like the Tokyo Kosei Wind Orchestra, the Desford Colliery Brass Band, the Brighouse and Rastrick Brass Band, all four Dutch military concert bands, the Frysk orkest (Frisian band), the Radio Blazersensemble (Radio Wind Ensemble) and the Dutch National Youth Fanfare Band have all been conducted by him. From 1978 until 1989, Jan de Haan also was conductor, composer and arranger for Dutch radio and television. As a programme maker he produced about 140 television music programmes. He also worked as a teacher at the Pedagogical Academy of Music in Leeuwarden for a number of years. Alongside his activities as a guest conductor, composer and international jury member, Jan de Haan was active at De Haske Publications. He founded this music publishing house in 1983, but sold his shares in the company 25 years later, in 2008, to be able to dedicate his time to composing, arranging and conducting.

Works for concert band

Works for brass bands

External links
 Official website Jan de Haan
 Biography of Jan de Haan 

1951 births
Living people
Dutch composers
Dutch conductors (music)
Male conductors (music)
Dutch publishers (people)
People from Nijefurd
21st-century conductors (music)
21st-century male musicians